Hal-Con Sci-Fi, Fantasy & Comic Convention, commonly known as Hal-Con, was founded in the 1970s and revived in the 2010s.  It is traditionally an annual weekend event held in Halifax, Nova Scotia in Atlantic Canada during the middle of Fall.

Originally showcasing comic books, games, science fiction/fantasy and film/television, and related popular arts,  it has grown to encompass the full spectrum of geekdom, including comic books, science fiction, fantasy, gaming, science fantasy, Renaissance, anime, furry, cyber goth, cosplay, and anything else of the fantastical while still having enough appeal for even the most casual fan. The gathering includes entertainment for most tastes from music, stage show, and small social gaming circles, and the chance to rub elbows with the famous and infamous of geek pop-culture.

Activities and events
 Celebrity Q&A sessions
 Autograph and photo booths
 Guest lectures
 Authors readings
 Anime and video rooms
 Artist alley
 Charity auction
 Specialty vendors
 Discussion panels
 Masquerade dance
 Costume contest
 Dressing in costume
 Gaming demonstrations, tournaments and play

Community involvement

Year round events
Hal-Con is active in the HRM community, promoting both the convention and Geek Culture. They hold events throughout the year leading up to the convention. These events include BBQs, dances, movie nights, game days, and they even participate in local parades and zombie walks with the help of fans.

Community parades
Hal-Con loves to participate in community celebrations - especially parades. Below is a sample list of the parades and awards won in parades around Halifax Regional Municipality.

 Eastern Passage Summer Carnival Parade – 2012–Present (Award Winner – 2012, 2014, 2015, 2016)
 Chronicle Herald Parade of Lights – 2012–Present (Award Winner – 2012, 2014, 2015)
 HRM Pride Parade – 2012–Present (Award Winner – 2016, 2017)
 Natal Day Parade – 2012–Present (Award Winner – 2013, 2015)
 St. Patrick's Day Parade – 2013-2015 (Award Winner – 2014, 2015)
 Annapolis Valley Apple Blossom Parade with Eastlink – 2014
 Multicultural Festival Parade – 2014
 Sackville Patriots Day Parade – 2014 (Award Winner – 2014)
 Halifax Official Zombie Walk – 2012-2014
 Cole Harbour Harvest Festival Parade – 2012, 2013
 Spryfield Annual Christmas Parade – 2012, 2013 (Award Winner – 2012, 2013)

Hal-Con also hosts and organizes their own Halloween parade (2012–present).

Charity

Hal-Con is active in charity events. Each year they host a live charity auction at the convention as well as numerous silent auctions with profits going to the IWK Children's Hospital and Kids Help Phone. They also participate with local groups such as Let It Roll, The Board Room Game Cafe, Cape and Cowl Collectibles and Gelatinous Dudes, to help with numerous charity fund-raising events with the funds going to local children groups, IWK Children's Hospital, Kids Help Phone, special needs camps, and Japan Disaster Relief.

In the first five years (2010–2015), they raised over $45,000 for charity.

Awards

 2016: The Coast, Best Of: Best Place to Volunteer (Bronze) 
 2015: The Coast, Best Of: Best Place to Volunteer (Silver) 
 2015: Destination Halifax: Spirit of Halifax 
 2014: The Coast, Best Of: Best Festival (Bronze)

Mascot

The Hal-Con mascot is named Nelson, which is a robot shaped like the Halifax Town Clock. The mascot is seen on Hal-Con promotional material and appears at every community event possible, as well as at the convention itself. Since the introduction of the mascot costume Nelson has appeared in numerous parades, played Laser Tag, avoided the undead in the Halifax Zombie Walk, and even ran a 10k marathon for charity.

An origin story for the mascot of Nelson explains how an alien from the planet Teebius named Nee comes to Earth, befriends a mouse named Zipper, makes a home with Zipper in a "Liveable Space Operating Node" (LSON) Robot, and decides to combine his name with the Robot's to become "Nelson".

In 2015 the Hal-Con website was redesigned, and the origin story was not included with the new website. However, on the new website is an entry for Nelson on the Hal-Con About Us web page, which provides a smaller description for the mascot:

Hal-Con history

The old
Hal-Con has a long history in Halifax, and was running annually for many years from the late 1970s through the 1980s. The convention began at Dalhousie University's School of Library Service as HalyCon I, and it was held on March 17, 1977. Then in 1978, the Halcon Science Fiction Society was launched by Bob Atkinson, John Bell, Sheldon Goldman, George Allanson, and Chris Kolovaris and the convention was renamed "Halcon" for Halcon II held March 9–11, 1979. Since Halcon came about as a result of Halycon, the numbering continued from the original event. Halcon II featured Ben Bova and Spider & Jeanne Robinson as guests. Then Halcon 3 was held in 1980 with author A.E. van Vogt as the featured guest, and the convention continued to be held annually until 1987. Halcon 10 was held in 1987 at The Westin Nova Scotian Hotel, and it would be the last Halcon until 2010.

The new
In 2010 the Hal-Con convention underwent a spiritual revival. The new Halcon, now called "Hal-Con", took the meaning of the old convention, the want to bring like-minded people together for fun, but did it under entirely new management and with modern convention practices. The official organizing committee is made up of volunteers who want nothing more than to make a successful convention in Atlantic Canada. Planning for the 2010 convention began in 2008, and was able to bring in nearly 1500 attendees to the Lord Nelson Hotel in Halifax. Since 2010 the convention has grown steadily, having had to move its venue after its first year, and was in the World Trade and Convention Centre and Scotiabank Centre in downtown Halifax until 2017.  In 2018 the convention moved to the Halifax Convention Center, where it is currently held.

Event history

References

External links
 Official site

Science fiction conventions in Canada
Multigenre conventions